Sir Edward Walter Parkes DL FREng (19 May 1926 – 25 September 2019) was Vice-Chancellor of City University London from 1974 to 1978 and of the University of Leeds from 1983 to 1991.

Life
Parkes was born in 1926.

Parkes attended King Edward's School, Birmingham, and St John's College, Cambridge, where he obtained a first class degree in mechanical engineering.  

Other posts included Head of the Department of Engineering at Leicester University in the 1960s and Chairman of the UK University Grants Committee in the early 1980s. From 1989 to 1991 he was Chairman of the Committee of Vice-Chancellors and Principals. He was also appointed a Fellow of the Royal Academy of Engineering in 1982.

Edward and Margaret Parkes commissioned Leicester based architect James Gowan to design them a holiday home on land they had bought above St David's Cathedral in Wales. The resulting Round House was listed after it was completed in 1967. 

Parkes was knighted in 1983.
There is a portrait in oils by Michael Noakes at City University. Parkes died in September 2019 at the age of 93.

Private life
He married the educationalist Margaret Parr (1925-2007) and they had two children. Margaret Parkes CBE died in 2007 having changed the UK's educationa system to include Design and Technology.

References

1926 births
2019 deaths
Academics of the University of Leicester
Alumni of St John's College, Cambridge
Deputy Lieutenants of West Yorkshire
English mechanical engineers
Fellows of the Royal Academy of Engineering
Knights Bachelor
People educated at King Edward's School, Birmingham
Presidents of City, University of London
Vice-Chancellors of the University of Leeds